Oilton can refer to:

 Oilton, Oklahoma
 Oilton, Texas